Two Sevens Clash is the debut album by roots reggae band Culture, recorded with producer Joe Gibbs at his own Joe Gibbs Recording Studio in Kingston in 1976, and released on Gibbs' eponymous label in 1977 (see 1977 in music). The album's title is a reference to the date of 7 July 1977.

Singer Joseph Hill said "Two Sevens Clash," Culture's most influential record, was based on a prediction by Marcus Garvey, who said there would be chaos on 7 July 1977, when the "sevens" met. With its apocalyptic message, the song created a stir in his Caribbean homeland and many Jamaican businesses and schools closed for the day.

The liner notes of the album read: "One day Joseph Hill had a vision, while riding a bus, of 1977 as a year of judgment - when two sevens clash - when past injustices would be avenged. Lyrics and melodies came into his head as he rode and thus was born the song "Two Sevens Clash" which became a massive hit in reggae circles both in Jamaica and abroad. The prophecies noted by the lyrics so profoundly captured the imagination of the people that on July 7, 1977 - the day when sevens fully clashed (seventh day, seventh month, seventy-seventh year) a hush descended on Kingston; many people did not go outdoors, shops closed, an air of foreboding and expectation filled the city."

Music critic Robert Christgau named the album one of the few import-only records from the 1970s he loved yet omitted from Christgau's Record Guide: Rock Albums of the Seventies (1981).

The album was reissued in 1988 with different cover art, and with the track listing altered with the last five tracks of the ten tracks listed first, and tracks 1-5 becoming tracks 6-10.

To mark its 40th anniversary, the album was reissued again in 2017. This version features an additional disc of remixes and dub versions. New sleeve notes were written by Don Letts.

Track listing

1977 original release

2007 30th Anniversary Edition

Personnel
Joseph Hill – lead vocals
Albert Walker – harmony vocals
Kenneth Dayes – harmony vocals
Lloyd Parks – bass
Sly Dunbar – drums
Lennox Gordon – guitar
Robbie Shakespeare – guitar
Eric "Bingy Bunny" Lamont – guitar
Franklyn "Bubbler" Waul – keyboards
Errol "Tarzan" Nelson – keyboards
Harold Butler – keyboards
Uziah "Sticky" Thompson – percussion
Herman Marquis – alto saxophone
Vin Gordon – trombone
Tommy McCook – tenor saxophone
Bobby Ellis – trumpet
Errol "ET" Thompson, Joe Gibbs - arranging, mixing

References

1977 debut albums
Culture (band) albums